Bait is a 2000 action comedy film starring Jamie Foxx and David Morse. It was directed by Antoine Fuqua. The film was a huge financial failure, costing Warner Bros. $51 million but only grossing approximately $15 million.

Plot
When fast talking, petty thief and hustler Alvin Sanders gets arrested for stealing prawns, the worst of his problems would seem to be going to jail. Unfortunately, he ends up sharing a cell with John Delano Jaster, a guy who, while stealing $42 million in gold from the Federal Reserve, double-crossed his partner, Bristol, after he murdered two bound and gagged guards during the gold heist. Bristol, who is the mastermind of the heist, is shown to be a dangerous man, with a knack for computers, a long memory, and who will go to any lengths to find where Jaster hid the gold, including killing others. While being interrogated by hardball Treasury Agent Edgar Clenteen, the double-crosser dies from heart failure.

All the feds have are an incomprehensible message that Jaster gave to Alvin to deliver to his wife, who is dead unbeknownst to him, having been killed by Bristol ("Tell her she should go to the Bronx Zoo. Tell her 'There's no place like home'."), so they decide to release him and use him as bait to catch Bristol by secretly implanting a combination tracking device and electronic bug into Alvin's jaw. From that moment on, a surveillance team can follow Alvin's every move and hear his every word. Unfortunately, Alvin has a talent for getting into trouble especially with his criminal younger brother Stevie —which means that the feds have to become his guardian angels so that he can serve his purpose. Sure enough, Bristol is hot on Alvin’s trail, using his computer expertise to discover that Alvin was jailed alongside Jaster and managing to gain more information from him through a phony telephone call.

Alvin soon becomes suspicious of the many situations that has occurred since he has been released from prison, especially when he encounters Bristol face to face, yet eventually Bristol kidnaps Alvin while evading the authorities, causing an explosion from a bomb attached to a bound and gagged agent Wooly. After interrogating Alvin, Bristol forces Alvin to lead him to the gold supposedly hidden at the horse track in Manhattan, while holding his girlfriend Lisa and baby hostage. Alvin manages to eventually escape and fight off Bristol and free Lisa before a bomb set in the van they’re in explodes. Alvin manages to hot wire the van, drive it and jump out just in time before the bomb explodes. Bristol catches up to Alvin and points a gun at him, yet Clenteen shoots him multiple times, saving Alvin. A grateful Alvin punches Clenteen due to earlier treatment while in jail, yet Clenteen, not upset by it, admits he had it coming.

While discussing with Lisa concerning their son Gregory at her bookstore, Alvin meets a customer asking for the book, "The Bronx Zoo", which leads him to understand Jaster's message; the gold is buried under "home" plate at Yankee Stadium. He then calls Clenteen to discuss a reward for the recovery of the stolen gold, which after some confusion turns out to be five percent of its value; two million dollars.

Cast
 Jamie Foxx as Alvin Sanders
 David Morse as Treasury Agent Edgar Clenteen
 Doug Hutchison as Bristol
 Kimberly Elise as Lisa Hill
 David Paymer as Treasury Agent Wooly
 Mike Epps as Stevie Sanders
 Robert Pastorelli as John Delano Jaster
 Jamie Kennedy as Treasury Agent Blum
 Nestor Serrano as Treasury Agent Boyle
 Kirk Acevedo as Ramundo
 Jeffrey Donovan as Julio
 Megan Dodds as Treasury Agent Walsh
 Tia Texada as Tika
 Neil Crone as Supervisor

Production
In May 1999, it was announced Jamie Foxx would star in the action-comedy Bait under the direction of Stephen Surjik who was eventually replaced by Antoine Fuqua. The film was co-produced by Castle Rock Entertainment and Village Roadshow Pictures with Warner Bros. distributing. Prior to casting David Morse as Edgar Clenteen, the role had originally been slated to be played by Kris Kristofferson.

Reception
On Rotten Tomatoes, the film has an approval rating of 26%, based on reviews from 82 critics. The website's consensus reads, "Even though Jamie Foxx shines in Bait, the movie suffers from music video roots and a formulaic script that strains credibility." On Metacritic, it has a score of 39 out of 100, based on reviews from 28 critics.

Roger Ebert gave it 3 out of 4 stars and wrote that "it's over the top, an exercise in action comedy that cuts loose from logic and enjoys itself."

Box office
The film opened at #2 at the North American box office making $5,485,591 USD in its opening weekend, behind The Watcher. Bait ultimately failed to bring back its $51 million budget, as it grossed only $15 million worldwide.

Soundtrack

A soundtrack was released on September 12, 2000 by Warner Bros. Records featuring rap and R&B music. The soundtrack reached No. 49 on the Top R&B/Hip-Hop Albums.

References

External links
 
 

2000 films
American action comedy films
American crime comedy films
African-American films
Castle Rock Entertainment films
Warner Bros. films
Films directed by Antoine Fuqua
Films about security and surveillance
Films scored by Mark Mancina
Films set in New York City
Films with screenplays by Tony Gilroy
2000s chase films
Techno-thriller films
Canadian action comedy films
English-language Canadian films
Canadian crime comedy films
2000s crime comedy films
2000 comedy films
2000s English-language films
2000s American films
2000s Canadian films